Tadhg Crowley (1 May 1890 – 25 July 1969) was an Irish revolutionary and Fianna Fáil politician. He was first elected to Dáil Éireann as a Teachta Dála (TD) for the Limerick constituency at the June 1927 general election.

Early life 
Born on 1 May 1890, in Ballylanders, County Limerick, Tadhg Crowley was the second eldest of eight sons and one sister. Timothy Crowley, his father, was the village postmaster and the proprietor of Crowley's Drapery, as well as the former secretary of the Hospital branch of the Irish Republican Brotherhood, while his mother was Ellen Ryan of Killeen. Crowley was educated at Rockwell College, County Tipperary.

Early revolutionary activities 
When the Ballylanders branch of the Irish Volunteers were set up in 1913, Tadhg Crowley stepped in and took charge. At the split of the Volunteers at the outbreak of the First World War, most of the Ballylanders company took the Redmondite side, however Crowley, along with a strong minority, chose to follow Eoin MacNeill. After a parade of the area's Volunteer Companies in Elton in 1914, Crowley and the men from Ballylanders placed first and were awarded with a cup.

Crowley was subsequently inducted into the Irish Republican Brotherhood (IRB) in 1915 by Ernest Blythe, with his many brothers soon to follow, and later that same year attended the funeral of Jeremiah O'Donovan Rossa at Glasnevin Cemetery.

War of Independence 
Kilmallock's postmaster came to Crowley's Drapery in early 1916 with an order from the government for the family to sever their revolutionary connections. To this, Tadhg's father, Timothy Crowley, gave no definite reply, and he contacted Eoin MacNeill about the matter. Upon careful consideration, Crowley resigned as captain of the Ballylanders Company, with his brothers following suit. However, they continued to act as auxiliaries in the organisation. At this time, Crowley was also operating as the head Centre of the IRB in the Ballylanders district, a group which included about 22 men.

Crowley followed MacNeill's orders not to take part in the Easter Rising, and a few months later, his father was removed from the position of postmaster, thereafter allowing the Crowleys to take in active part in the Volunteer movement once again. In 1920, and with plans to attack the Ballylanders RIC barracks, Crowley informed his father that the drapery was to be used for purpose of the attack, which he of course made no objection to, having been a Fenian himself, and soldiers fired from Crowley's Drapery during the attack.

In July 1920, the drapery was attacked by the British, and soon after they came back to arrest Tadhg's brothers Peter, John and Michael, the former two of whom would be part of the 94-day-hunger-strike in Cork Gaol, the longest without any food in history. On 25 July Crowley's Drapery was set on fire, and soon after blown up, causing damages worth £22,500. With three of their brothers in prison, Tadhg, along with Joseph and James Crowley, went on the run. He was later arrested, and sentenced to 15 years' penal servitude, a sentence which he did not end up fully serving after the Anglo-Irish Treaty came into effect.

Political career 
After Ireland's independence, Crowley ran in the 1924 Limerick by-election, losing with 23,738 votes to Richard O'Connell. During the campaign, meetings across the county in support of him were addressed by a wide range of Anti-Treaty leaders, including Mary MacSwiney, her sister, Annie MacSwiney, Caitlín Brugha, Kathleen Lynn, Gobnait Ní Bhruadair, Constance Markievicz, Dan Breen, Michael Comyn, Art O'Connor, and Mrs. O'Malley, the mother of Ernie O'Malley. 

He was elected to the 5th Dáil as a Fianna Fáil candidate for the Limerick constituency at the June 1927 general election. He was re-elected at each subsequent general election until he lost his seat at the 1937 general election. He regained his seat at the 1938 general election and held it at the 1943 general election, but lost his seat again at the 1944 general election. Crowley was elected to the 5th Seanad in 1944 by the Industrial and Commercial Panel. He was defeated at the 1948 Seanad election. He was once more elected to the Dáil at the 1951 general election and was re-elected at the 1954 general election. Crowley did not contest the 1957 general election but did contest the 1957 Seanad election, and was elected to the 9th Seanad by the Industrial and Commercial Panel. He did not contest the 1961 Seanad election.

Later life 
Following his retirement from politics, Tadhg lived for a time in Ballylanders, before moving in with his sister, Bridget O'Donnell, at her home in Scarteen.

Death 
Tadhg Crowley died on 25 July 1969, in his sister's home in Scarteen, aged 79. He was buried in Ladywell Cemetery, Ballylanders, in the Republican plot, along with his brothers Joseph and Michael.

References

1890 births
1969 deaths
Fianna Fáil TDs
Members of the 5th Dáil
Members of the 6th Dáil
Members of the 7th Dáil
Members of the 8th Dáil
Members of the 10th Dáil
Members of the 11th Dáil
Members of the 5th Seanad
Members of the 14th Dáil
Members of the 15th Dáil
Members of the 9th Seanad
Politicians from County Limerick
Fianna Fáil senators